Marcus McElhenney (born July 27, 1981) is an American coxswain. He won a bronze medal in the men's eight at the 2008 Summer Olympics.

Life and career
McElhenney first competed internationally in 2001, representing the United States in Linz, Austria at the Nations' Cup (Under 23 World Championships)  where he coxed the men's eight to a silver medal. McElhenney was invited to try out for the 2002 Under 23 World Championship team.

His first major international success at the senior/Olympic level came at the 2003 World Rowing Championships in Milan where he won a gold medal in the coxed four event. A year later at the 2004 World Rowing Championships, he won a bronze medal in the same event. At 2005 World Rowing Championships he coxed both the eights and fours, winning a gold and a silver medal respectively, the first US athlete to have earned two medals at the same World Rowing Championships. In 2007 won both the eights and coxed fours at the 2007 USRowing championships.

McElhenney grew up in Delaware County, Pennsylvania and graduated from Temple University in Philadelphia, Pennsylvania.  He is also the cousin of actor Rob McElhenney. He served as principal architect of the coxswain curriculum at Sparks Rowing, a social business that provides the largest amount of coxswain specific programming in the world. McElhenney graduated from the University of San Francisco School of law, and he currently practices law in California.

Competitive history

Senior

References

External links
 
 
 
 
 

1981 births
Living people
American male rowers
Rowers at the 2008 Summer Olympics
Medalists at the 2008 Summer Olympics
Olympic bronze medalists for the United States in rowing
World Rowing Championships medalists for the United States
Pan American Games medalists in rowing
Pan American Games gold medalists for the United States
People from Drexel Hill, Pennsylvania
Rowers at the 2011 Pan American Games
Sportspeople from Delaware County, Pennsylvania
Medalists at the 2011 Pan American Games